The New York State Commission on Judicial Conduct is an eleven-member panel with authority to discipline judges of the New York courts. The Commission is constitutionally established to investigate and prosecute complaints filed against New York judges.

Procedure 
The commission receives complaints, investigates and makes initial determinations regarding judicial conduct. The Commission may privately caution or publicly admonish, censure a judge, remove from office, or mandatorily retire a judge found guilty of misconduct. The Commission's decisions are subject to review by the New York Court of Appeals, upon a judge's request, which may confirm or reject the Commission's findings of misconduct, and reduce or increase a recommended sanction.

The rules and regulations of the commission are compiled in Title 22, Subtitle C, Chapter V of the New York Codes, Rules and Regulations (NYCRR), whereas the rules concerning review by the Court of Appeals are compiled in  Title 22, Subtitle B, Chapter I, Subchapter D of the NYCRR.

Composition 
Commission members are judges, lawyers and non-lawyers appointed by the Governor, the Chief Judge, and leaders of the New York State Legislature.

See also 
 Judicial council (United States)

References

External links 
 
 State Commission on Judicial Conduct in the New York Codes, Rules and Regulations
 Review of Determinations of the State Commission on Judicial Conduct in the NYCRR
 New York State Commission on Judicial Conduct in Open NY (https://data.ny.gov/)

State Commission on Judicial Conduct
State Commission on Judicial Conduct